Lucas Rafael Rossi (born 2 June 1985) is an Argentine field hockey player who plays as a midfielder for Belgian club Braxgata and the Argentine national team.

Club career
Rossi played for Banco Provincia in Argentina. During the 2005–06 season, he played for Harvestehude in the German Bundesliga. He returned to Europe for the 2007–08 season when he signed for Orée in Belgium. He left Orée in 2010 for Léopold. After one season at Léopold he returned to Argentina to focus on the national team in preparation for the 2012 Summer Olympics. After the 2012 Olympics he returned to Léopold. Since 2015 he plays for Royal Beerschot. It was announced in March 2021 that he would join Braxgata for the 2021–22 season.

International career
At the 2012 Summer Olympics, Rossi competed for the national team in the men's tournament. He was a part of the Argentina squad which won the gold medal at the 2016 Summer Olympics. Rossi has won the bronze medal at the 2014 Men's Hockey World Cup and two gold medals at the Pan American Games. He retired from international hockey after the 2018 World Cup to spend more time with his family. In October 2019, he returned in the national team as he was called up for the October 2019 Europe tour.

References

External links

1985 births
Living people
Field hockey players from Buenos Aires
Argentine male field hockey players
Male field hockey midfielders
Field hockey players at the 2007 Pan American Games
2010 Men's Hockey World Cup players
Field hockey players at the 2011 Pan American Games
Field hockey players at the 2012 Summer Olympics
2014 Men's Hockey World Cup players
Field hockey players at the 2015 Pan American Games
Field hockey players at the 2016 Summer Olympics
2018 Men's Hockey World Cup players
Olympic field hockey players of Argentina
Pan American Games gold medalists for Argentina
Olympic gold medalists for Argentina
Olympic medalists in field hockey
Medalists at the 2016 Summer Olympics
Pan American Games medalists in field hockey
South American Games gold medalists for Argentina
South American Games medalists in field hockey
Competitors at the 2006 South American Games
Argentine expatriate sportspeople in Belgium
Expatriate field hockey players
Men's Belgian Hockey League players
Royal Beerschot THC players
Harvestehuder THC players
Medalists at the 2007 Pan American Games
Medalists at the 2011 Pan American Games
Medalists at the 2015 Pan American Games
Royal Léopold Club players
Field hockey players at the 2020 Summer Olympics
21st-century Argentine people